"Under a Raging Moon" is a song by Roger Daltrey, the lead singer of The Who. This song is the tenth & title track on Daltrey's sixth solo album, Under a Raging Moon.

The single reached #43 in the UK and #10 on the Billboard's Mainstream Rock Charts, but failed to chart on the United States pop singles chart.

The tune was written by John Parr (of St Elmo's Fire fame) and Julia Downes. It is a tribute to The Who's former drummer, Keith Moon, who died in 1978. It was said that The Who's bass player John Entwistle had wanted to play this song instead of "Won't Get Fooled Again" when the band performed at Live Aid in 1985, but guitarist Pete Townshend disagreed. Entwistle decided to record his own version on his live solo album Left for Live as a tribute to Moon instead.

Reception 

Mike DeGagne of Allmusic reviewed the recording, stating "Daltrey's thunderous but passionate ode to his former friend and drummer Keith Moon is a fervent downpour of frustration that can be truly felt inside every line of the song. A spectacular drum solo from Mark Brzezicki is a modest tribute to the late Moon and adds depth." Additionally, Rolling Stone's review said, "Parr's entry is the heartfelt title track, a clunky, roaring number that mourns Keith Moon with more sentiment than clarity. A bombastic hodgepodge salvaged by a passionate vocal, "Under a Raging Moon" unabashedly quotes "Baba O'Riley" and – in an old-fashioned bit of show-stopping theatre – employs seven drummers, including Stewart Copeland, Carl Palmer and Martin Chambers, each of whom plays a section of the elegy."

References

External links

1985 songs
Songs written by John Parr
Commemoration songs
Atlantic Records singles